Víctor Manuel López Narge (born April 9, 1971 in Libertad) is a retired football striker from Uruguay, who was nicknamed "Campanita" ("Little Bell" or "Tinker Bell") during his career. Having made his debut on May 5, 1991 against the United States (0-1), he obtained a total number of eight international cups for his national team, scoring one goal in a friendly match against Mexico on May 7, 1991.

References

External links
  Profile

1971 births
Living people
Uruguayan footballers
Uruguay international footballers
1991 Copa América players
Uruguayan Primera División players
Argentine Primera División players
Peñarol players
Defensor Sporting players
Centro Atlético Fénix players
Ferro Carril Oeste footballers
Expatriate footballers in Argentina
Expatriate footballers in Spain
Expatriate footballers in Russia
Uruguayan expatriate footballers
Club Atlético Independiente footballers
Club Atlético Los Andes footballers
Association football forwards
CF Extremadura footballers
FC Elista players
Russian Premier League players